= Lidiya Ryndina =

Russian actress

- Born: Lidiya Ryndina; 1883
- Died: 1964 (aged 80–81)
- Occupation: actress
- Years active: 1914–1925

Lidiya Ryndina (Russian: Лидия Рындина) was a Russian Empire and Soviet film actress.

== Selected filmography ==
- 1916 — Vozmezdiye
- 1916 — Koldunya
- 1916 — Razorvannye tsepi
